"What Happened to Virgil" is a song by American rapper Lil Durk featuring fellow American rapper Gunna from the former's seventh studio album 7220 (2022). Produced by Chopsquad DJ, the song is a tribute to fashion designer Virgil Abloh.

Background
The song is a tribute to fashion designer and entrepreneur Virgil Abloh, Lil Durk's brother D Thang and rapper King Von. Abloh died in November 2021 and was a friend of Lil Durk.

Following its release, the song was popularly used in videos on TikTok. Durk promised to release the song's music video if it reached 10,000 creations on TikTok.

Music video
The official music video was directed by Cole Bennett and released on April 12, 2022. It opens with a quote from Abloh that reads: "Life is so short that you can't waste even a day subscribing to what someone thinks you can do versus knowing what you can do." The video features Lil Durk and Gunna rapping in the presence of multiple sets inspired by Abloh's work, including near Drake's Air Drake jet (which was painted by Abloh), on a red rooftop that replicates the Louis Dreamhouse from one of Abloh's final projects for Louis Vuitton, and in a warehouse filled with magically growing flowers. At the end of the video, it is explained how each of these sets are related to Abloh.

Charts

Weekly charts

Year-end charts

Certifications

References

2022 songs
Lil Durk songs
Gunna (rapper) songs
Songs written by Lil Durk
Songs written by Gunna (rapper)
Music videos directed by Cole Bennett